Mateusz Bieniek (born 5 April 1994) is a Polish professional volleyball player. He is a member of the Poland national team, a participant in the Olympic Games (Rio 2016, Tokyo 2020), and the 2018 World Champion. At the professional club level, he plays for PGE Skra Bełchatów.

Career

National team
On 2 April 2015, he was called up to the Polish national team led by Stéphane Antiga. He debuted in the national team on 28 May 2015 in a match of the 2015 World League against Russia (3–0). He achieved 14 points and was named the Most Valuable Player of the match. On 30 September 2018, Poland achieved its third title of the World Champions. Poland beat Brazil in the final (3–0) and defended the title from 2014.

Honours

Clubs
 FIVB Club World Championship
  Betim 2019 – with Cucine Lube Civitanova
 National championships
 2016/2017  Polish Cup, with ZAKSA Kędzierzyn-Koźle
 2016/2017  Polish Championship, with ZAKSA Kędzierzyn-Koźle
 2018/2019  Polish Cup, with ZAKSA Kędzierzyn-Koźle
 2018/2019  Polish Championship, with ZAKSA Kędzierzyn-Koźle
 2019/2020  Italian Cup, with Cucine Lube Civitanova

Individual awards
 2021: FIVB Nations League – Best Middle Blocker
 2022: Polish Championship – Best Server
 2022: FIVB Nations League – Best Middle Blocker
 2022: FIVB World Championship – Best Middle Blocker

State awards
 2018:  Gold Cross of Merit

References

External links

 
 Player profile at LegaVolley.it   
 Player profile at PlusLiga.pl   
 Player profile at Volleybox.net
 
 

1994 births
Living people
People from Częstochowa County
Sportspeople from Silesian Voivodeship
Polish men's volleyball players
Olympic volleyball players of Poland
Volleyball players at the 2016 Summer Olympics
Volleyball players at the 2020 Summer Olympics
Polish expatriate sportspeople in Italy
Expatriate volleyball players in Italy
Effector Kielce players
ZAKSA Kędzierzyn-Koźle players
Volley Lube players
Skra Bełchatów players
Middle blockers